Africocypha is a genus of jewel damselfly in the family Chlorocyphidae. There are at least three described species in Africocypha.

Species
These three species belong to the genus Africocypha:
 Africocypha centripunctata (Gambles, 1975)
 Africocypha lacuselephantum (Karsch, 1899)
 Africocypha varicolor Dijkstra, Mézière & Günther, 2015

References

Further reading

 
 
 

Chlorocyphidae
Articles created by Qbugbot